The Derby Line–Stanstead Border Crossing is a border crossing station on the Canada–United States border, connecting the towns of Stanstead, Quebec and Derby Line, Vermont. It connects Main Street (U.S. Route 5) in Derby Line with Quebec Route 143 in Stanstead. It is one of two local crossings between the two towns (the other is the Beebe Plain–Beebe Border Crossing), which historically had many more. This was a major crossing point until the construction of Interstate 91 (I-91) and the Derby Line–Rock Island Border Crossing in 1965. The historic 1930s United States station facilities were listed on the National Register of Historic Places in 2014. Both stations are open 24 hours per day.

Setting
This border crossing is located between the villages of Derby Line, Vermont and Stanstead, Quebec, both of which are developed up to the border.  The two villages have a historically friendly relationship with one another, and there were several roads east of the U.S. 5-Quebec 143 crossing that once crossed the border, but have been barricaded since 2009.  The cross-border relationship was cemented in part by the construction in 1904 of the Haskell Free Library and Opera House, which straddles the border and provides library services to both communities.  The border itself is an east–west line, with a portion of the Tomifobia River running east–west just to its north.  The bi-national nature of these two villages has always presented border security challenges, and in recent years local residents have been prohibited from moving freely from one side to the other.  Prior to the September 11 attacks, anyone could enter the United States using any of the roads, as long as they then proceeded directly to the nearest port of entry to report. Since then however, cross-border travel between the villages on any road other than U.S. Route 5 or I-91 is strictly prohibited.

United States station
Its main building is a two-story brick Georgian Revival structure with a hip roof. A metal porte-cochere extends across two lanes, diverted from the roadway for the processing of incoming vehicles. Behind the main building stand an eight-bay vehicle inspection garage, and a wood-frame cattle inspection facility. Due to a decrease in the use of the crossing, only the southern part of the main building is used for customs and immigration; the northern portion now houses the local post office.

The station was formally opened in 1932, when the main building was completed.  It is one of several standardized inspection station layouts developed by the United States Treasury Department, and was the largest and most architecturally sophisticated of those built in Vermont in the 1930s.  It was built as part of a program to improve border security developed to respond to increased use of the automobile, increased illegal border crossing, and smuggling related to Prohibition.  The principal alterations to the building have been to the northern half of the ground floor, to accommodate the new use as a post office.

Prior to 1932, U.S. Customs operated out of an office in a hotel that was located adjacent to the current border station.  In the 1920s, Customs and Immigration offices were located in a rented home.

Canadian station

The current Canada border station was built in 1970. The former Canada border station still stands adjacent to it, and functions as a restaurant.

See also
 List of Canada–United States border crossings
 National Register of Historic Places listings in Orleans County, Vermont

References

Canada–United States border crossings
Stanstead, Quebec
Buildings and structures in Derby, Vermont
Government buildings on the National Register of Historic Places in Vermont
National Register of Historic Places in Orleans County, Vermont
1909 establishments in Quebec
1909 establishments in Vermont
Transportation in Orleans County, Vermont